Flynn Sant (born 2001), known professionally as Flowerkid (stylised in all lowercase) is an Australian producer, singer/songwriter from Sydney, New South Wales.

His songs "Boy with the Winfields and the Wild Heart" and "Miss Andry" both received full rotation on Triple J in 2019.

Early life
Flynn grew up in Western Sydney and left secondary school in year 10.

Sant grew up in a Catholic household completing his sacraments at a young age.

Personal life
Sant is a trans man.

In an interview with the guardian, Sant says, “I was so little and all I could think was that I was a sinner. I was going to hell,”  in relation to his song “I Met The Devil At 4 Years Old”. He explains how his trauma affected his spirituality from a young age.

Musical style and influences
Sant cites Frank Ocean and Miley Cyrus as musical influences.

There is a link between Sant and Billie as their shared manager was “blown away” by Sants production skills

Career
Sant signed a worldwide record deal to Warner Music, Wonderlick, Parlophone and Atlantic Records in 2020.

Discography

Singles

Albums

Awards and nominations

Rolling Stone Australia Awards
The Rolling Stone Australia Awards are awarded annually by the Australian edition of Rolling Stone magazine for outstanding contributions to popular culture in the previous year.

|-
! scope="row"| 2021
| "Miss Andry"
| Best Single
| 
|}

References

External links
 

21st-century Australian singers
Australian musicians
Living people
Musicians from Sydney
2001 births